Chicken & Champagne is a split EP by the Huntington Beach, California punk rock band Guttermouth and the Australian band Mach Pelican, released in 2000 by Shock Records. It contains 3 tracks by each band.

Track listing
"Memories" (Guttermouth)
"Australia" (Guttermouth)
"Six Foot Party Sub" (Guttermouth)
'Shit Off Your Face" (Mach Pelican)
"Annoyed" (Mach Pelican)
"Am I Ever Gonna See Your Face Again" (written & originally performed by The Angels)
Tracks 1-3 performed by Guttermouth
Tracks 4-6 performed by Mach Pelican

Performers

Guttermouth
Mark Adkins - vocals
Scott Sheldon - guitar
Eric "Derek" Davis - guitar
James Nunn - bass guitar
William Tyler "Ty" Smith - drums

Album information
Record label: Shock Records
Tracks 1-3 recorded by Donnell Cameron and mixed by Jim Goodwin at Paramount Studios
Tracks 4 & 5 recorded at Backbeach Studios January 2000, produced by D.W. Norton and Mach Pelican, engineered and mixed by D.W. Norton, and written by Toshi Maeda
Track 6 recorded at Sing Sing Studio July 1999, engineered and mixed by Christopher Dickie, and written by the Angels

Guttermouth EPs
Mach Pelican albums
2000 EPs
Shock Records EPs